Ascobulla fragilis is a species of sea snail, a marine gastropod sacoglossan mollusk in the family Volvatellidae.

The complete nucleotide sequence of the mitochondrial genome of Ascobulla fragilis has been available since 2008.

Gavagnin et al. (1994) placed this species accidentally and erroneously in a different genus.

Distribution 
The type locality is La Spezia, Italy.

References

External links 
 photo

Volvatellidae
Gastropods described in 1856
Taxa named by John Gwyn Jeffreys